The Arriflex 535 is a movie camera product line created by Arri in 1990 to replace the Arriflex 35 BL line. 

As such, its potential applications are widespread, and thus it is regularly used as a primary camera on feature films, second unit work on features, on music videos, commercials, special effects work and motion control, among other usage. Before the introduction of the Arricam System, the 535 was one of the most popular 35 mm sync-sound movie camera in usage, due to its wide range of production adoption, intuitive design, high reliability, and retail availability. In recognition of the achievements of the 535 system, AMPAS awarded Arri a Scientific and Engineering Academy Award in 1995. The original variant was capable of between three and fifty frames per second.

Arriflex 535B
Variation of the 535, introduced in 1992. One of the main advantages is the higher frame rate of sixty frames per second.

Until he switched over to the digital Arri Alexa line of cameras, the 535 had been the choice camera of renowned cinematographer Roger Deakins for much of his career.

External links
 Arriflex 535B

Movie cameras